Rahmatabad (also Romanized as Raḩmatābād; also known as Raḩmatābād-e Katūl) is a village in Estarabad Rural District, Kamalan District, Aliabad County, Golestan Province, Iran. At the 2006 census, its population was 2,493, in 667 families.

References 

Populated places in Aliabad County